The Orquestra Simfònica del Gran Teatre del Liceu (Symphony Orchestra of the Gran Teatre del Liceu) is the opera orchestra of the Gran Teatre del Liceu in Barcelona, Spain.  Founded concurrently with the theatre in 1847 (actually, it continues the orchestra of the Liceu previous theatre, founded in 1837 and active since 1838), it is the oldest orchestra still working in Barcelona, and the oldest in Spain.  The orchestra also performs symphony concerts at such venues as the Palau de la Música Catalana and at L'Auditori.

The first conductor of the orchestra was Marià Obiols.  The orchestra subsequently worked with guest conductors, including the composers Manuel de Falla, Alexander Glazunov, Richard Strauss, Igor Stravinsky, Ottorino Respighi, and Pietro Mascagni, but with no principal conductor or music director.  The first music director was Ernest Xancó, who took up the post in 1959 and served in that capacity until 1961.  Subsequent music directors have included Uwe Mund (1987-1994), Bertrand de Billy (1999-2004), Sebastian Weigle (2004–2008), and Michael Boder (2008-2012).  In October 2010, the company announced the appointment of Josep Pons as its next music director, as of September 2012, for an initial contract of 6 years.

Premieres performed by the orchestra
The Liceu opera house has been the location for the world premieres of several works, and for the Spanish premieres of many musical works, such as the following:

1847 (April 4) Marià Obiols' cantata Il regio imene, the first musical work performed by the orchestra in the inauguration day  
1853 (January 8)  Temistocle Solera's Spanish opera La hermana de Pelayo, first opera premiered by the orchestra
1874 (April 14) Felipe Pedrell's opera L'ultimo Abenzerraggio
1892 (May 14) Tomás Bretón's opera Garín
1895 (May 8) Isaac Albéniz's opera Henry Clifford
1896 (January 5) Isaac Albéniz's opera Pepita Jiménez
1902 (January 4) Felipe Pedrell's grand opera Els Pirineus
1903 (December 3) Joan Manén's opera Acté
1906 (January 20) Enric Morera's opera Empòrium
1913 (January 15) Jaume Pahissa's first opera Gal·la Placídia
1923 (March 31) Jaume Pahissa's Marianela
1929 Manuel Blancafort's symphonic poem Matí de festa a Puiggraciós
1932 (March 3) Joan Manén's opera Neró i Acté
1948 (January 10) Xavier Montsalvatge's children opera El gato con botas
1948 (January 10) Carlos Surinach's El mozo que casó con mujer brava
1950 (December 14) Conrado del Campo's Lola la Piconera
1955 (December 19) Joaquín Rodrigo's ballet Pavana Real
1956 (April 28) Frederic Mompou and Xavier Montsalvatge's ballet Perlimplinada
1961 (November 24) Manuel de Falla and Ernesto Halffter's scenic cantata Atlàntida
1962 (December 11)  Xavier Montsalvatge's Una voce in off
1974 (January 19)  Matilde Salvador's Vinatea
1986 (May 22) Josep Soler's Oedipus et Iocasta
1988 (September 21)  Xavier Benguerel's scenic cantata Llibre vermell
1989 (September 24)  Leonardo Balada's opera Cristóbal Colón
1990 (October 5) Xavier Benguerel's oratory Requiem for Salvador Espriu, at the Torroella de Montgrí International Festival of Music
2000 (October 2) José Luis Turina's opera D.Q., Don Quijote en Barcelona, with settings by La Fura dels Baus
2004 (November 3)  Joan Guinjoan's opera Gaudí

Music Directors
 1959-1961 Ernest Xancó
 1981-1984 Eugenio Marco
 1987-1994 Uwe Mund
 1999-2004 Bertrand de Billy
 2004–2008 Sebastian Weigle
 2008-2012 Michael Boder
 2012–present Josep Pons

Media

References

External links
 Official home page (in Catalan)
 Liceu official page on the appointment of Josep Pons as music director

Catalan orchestras
Culture in Barcelona
1847 establishments in Spain
Musical groups established in 1847
1837 establishments in Spain
Musical groups established in 1837
Liceu